Dhar is a village in Parbhani taluka of Parbhani district of Maharashtra state in India.

Demography
According to the 2011 census of India, Dhar had a population of 1102, of which 572 were male and 530 were female. The average sex ratio of the village was 927, which was lower than the Maharashtra state average of 929. The literacy rate was 72.48% compared to 82.3% for the state. Male literacy rate was 84% while female literacy rate was 60%.

Geography and Transport
Following table shows distance of Dhar from some of major cities.

References

Villages in Parbhani district